John Clive Mackintosh, 3rd Viscount Mackintosh of Halifax (born 9 September 1958) is a British chartered accountant and peer.

He was educated at The Leys School and Oriel College, Oxford (MA, Philosophy, Politics, and Economics).

He sat in the House of Lords from 1980 until 1999, when he lost his seat after the passing of the House of Lords Act 1999.

References

External links

 Debrett's People of Today

1958 births
Living people
People educated at The Leys School
Alumni of Oriel College, Oxford
Presidents of the Oxford University Conservative Association
Conservative Party (UK) hereditary peers
Viscounts in the Peerage of the United Kingdom
Mackintosh of Halifax